Fuchengmen (Manchu:;Möllendorf:elgiyen i mutehe duka) was a gate on the western side of Beijing's city wall.  The gate was torn down in the 1960s, and has been replaced by the Fuchengmen overpass on the 2nd Ring Road.  Fuchengmen Station is a transportation node, where a number of public buses and Line 2 of the Beijing Subway stop.  The street that once passed through the gate is still named in its relation to the gate.  East of Fuchengmen, it is known as Fuchengmen Inner Street because it would have been inside the wall.  West of Fuchengmen, it is known as Fuchengmen Outer Street.  Further west, the street becomes Fushi Road (China National Highway 109). 

Gates of Beijing
Neighbourhoods of Beijing
Road transport in Beijing
Xicheng District
Demolished buildings and structures in China
Buildings and structures demolished in the 1960s